Tiny Heroes, also distributed in Germany as Bobo und die Hasenbande 2, is a 1997 Hungarian animated film directed by József Gémes. It is a sequel to the 1991 film The Seventh Brother. It depicts forest animals working together to combat poachers. The 1 hour and 16 minutes long film received a pg-13 rating.

Synopsis
A band of poachers is on the hunt for several forest animals (as informed by Dr. Owl). Unfortunately, during an attempt at rescue, Dr. Owl ends up captured. J.C. and the other young bunnies rush off to save him, but end up captured as well. Running low on options, Mr. and Mrs. Rabbit go to get Tiny's help. Tiny- who has become annoyed with his easy, boring and predictable house life -rushes off to free his adoptive siblings, break loose the other animals and send the poachers packing.

Plot
Tiny is a dog owned by a forest ranger. Continuing from the story in the original film, he has grown up slightly and has a bit more freedom in life helping Angie's grandfather with his park ranger duties; despite this, he is still treated like a puppy by Angie, his owner. Because of this, Tiny longs to be like Dr. Owl, the protector of the forest. Likewise, he also longs to see his bunny friends again.

While on a nightly patrol, Dr. Owl spies something odd- a car driving up to a run-down castle perched on a nearby mountain. Curious and concerned, Dr. Owl sneaks in for a closer look. What he finds concerns him- a wealthy man named Mr. Abbadon is hiring local poachers- the formerly noteworthy Boris E. Ratso and his dimwitted aide, Mr. Phineas Pike -to capture all of the forest animals. While Abbadon's motives aren't clear, he does stress heavily that the animals are to be unharmed and brought back alive. Worried for everyone, Dr. Owl contacts Tiny and tells him that the ranger must be informed of what has transpired. Alas, despite his best efforts, Tiny is the only one who sees the poachers as a threat (whilst Angie and her grandpa are completely hoodwinked by the poachers).

Thankfully, Angie's grandfather isn't entirely fooled and decides to keep an eye on the two; unfortunately, he can't be on duty forever, which allows the poachers to begin their work. To their frustration, Dr. Owl stops their work before it can begin, giving Ratso a case of hypothermia in the process. Later, Mr. Pike convinces Boris to catch the owl, too, thus earning them more money; alas, Dr. Owl doesn't quite fall for their tactics, but ends up captured all the same. Sending Ailsworth- a local mouse -to inform the rest of the forest as to what happened, Dr. Owl is carted away to the castle whilst the poachers recover from the past evening's failures.

Gaining the aid of Ms. Magpie, the forest gossip, Ailsworth is able to inform the forest of the incoming threat. Unfortunately, with the owl gone, morale is at a severe low. Of course, all is not lost- Ailsworth is able to convince the animals that they are all "someones in particular" and that, so long as they remember that, they can succeed. Inspired by Ailsworth, the forest animals all move ahead with separate plans to keep their families safe; the rabbits, however, decide to enact a bold plan- to sneak in the castle to save Mr. Owl. Receiving some unexpected help from the hawk that attacked J.C, the bunnies go to the castle (making sure to inform their parents via a bug messenger) under cover of darkness.

Alas, their plan goes up in smoke when a pack of weasels- the pets of Mr. Pike -surround them in the prison room where Dr. Owl is held. Learning of their children's daring plan, Mr. and Mrs. Rabbit are naturally concerned heavily. The two rush off to get the help of Tiny and the ranger, but find Tiny alone (courtesy of a trick from Mr. Ratso). With no other choice, Tiny (who receives aid from the hawk) makes off for the castle. Finding that the weasels are only loyal to Mr. Pike because of the fine meat he provides, the two heroes rain the stuff down on them (oddly, it continues long after the bag has emptied). Tiny quickly finds his adoptive family and Mr. Owl and sets them free; unfortunately, the majority of the weasels still stay loyal to the poachers and wake them just as the rabbits escape. A lengthy chase ensues, but the bunnies and Tiny are able to outwit Mr. Pike and his ravenous pets.

In the woods, Mr. Ratso is trying to catch the animals quickly, as the deadline is soon upon him. Fortunately, his attempts to capture a moose continue to blow up in his face. He comes very close to catching one when he feigns defeat, but Dr. Owl quickly arrives to aid the moose. Losing his patience, Mr. Ratso has Mr. Pike help him with one last trap- a net intended to capture all the animals in one fell swoop. Thankfully, the plan comes undone and the poachers end up caught in their own trap, arrested alongside Mr. Abbadon, who Tiny ends up saving when Ratso goes turncoat on his former employer. With the villains all rounded up, Angie's grandfather sends them off to court for their respective trials; while Ratso and Pike are incarcerated, Mr. Abbadon gets out relatively unscathed, perhaps suggesting a lighter side to him. The film concludes with a massive party back at Tiny's home with all the forest animals present and happily gorging themselves on food.

Cast

English cast
 Aaron Bybee - Tiny (voice)
 Laura Schulthies - Johanna (voice)
 Joey Lopez - J.C. (voice)
 Andy Soren - Cody (voice)
 Christina Schaub - Rebecca (voice)
 Sarah Baker - Mimi (voice)
 Logan Hall - Marty (voice)
 Oly Jeffson - Boris (voice)
 Duane Stevens - Finias / Muskrat / Hedgehog (voice)
 Katie Moyes - Angie (voice)
 Margo Watson - Serena (voice)
 Alan Peterson - Sol (voice)
 Richard Dayhuff - Grandfather (voice)
 Joe Requa - Owl (voice)
 Christopher Robin Miller - Alysworth / Other Animals (voice) (as Chris Miller)

References

External links

1997 animated films
Hungarian animated films
Hungarian children's films
Films set in forests
Animated films about dogs
German films
Hungarian films
German animated films
German children's films
1990s children's animated films